Rachael Ngeungeu Te Irirangi Zister  (née Beamish, 10 October 1893 – 22 May 1997) was a New Zealand woman of mana, a secretary and community leader. Of Māori descent, she identified with the Ngāti Tai and Ngāti Paoa iwi. She was born in Waiariki, Waikato, New Zealand in 1893.

In the 1989 New Year Honours, Zister was appointed a Commander of the Order of the British Empire, for services to the Māori people. She was awarded the New Zealand 1990 Commemoration Medal in 1990 and the New Zealand Suffrage Centennial Medal in 1993.

References

1893 births
Ngāi Tai ki Tāmaki people
Ngāti Pāoa people
New Zealand Commanders of the Order of the British Empire
1997 deaths
New Zealand centenarians
Recipients of the New Zealand Suffrage Centennial Medal 1993
Women centenarians